Colonials may refer to:

 Colonisers, implementers of colonization or colonialism
 Citizens of the colonies of British America

Sports

Amateur and college
 Colonials (synchronized skating team), from West Acton, Massachusetts
 George Washington Colonials, the athletic teams of George Washington University
 Purcellville Cannons, previously Luray Colonials, a collegiate summer baseball team
 Robert Morris Colonials, the athletic teams of Robert Morris University

Professional
 Hartford Colonials, a UFL American football team 2009–2010
 Jersey Blues FC, previously Morris County Colonials, a National Premier Soccer League team
 Kingston Colonials, an American Basketball League team 1935–1940
 Kingston Colonials (baseball), an American minor-league team 1885–1951
 Pittsfield Colonials, a Can-Am League baseball team 1997-2011

See also
 Colonial (disambiguation), including uses of The Colonial